Ahmad Shabery bin Cheek (born 10 December 1958) is a Malaysian politician. He was the Minister of  Agriculture and Agro-based Industry in the Barisan Nasional (BN) coalition government (2015-2018), and sat in Parliament as the member for Kemaman, Terengganu from 2004 to May 2018. He represents the United Malays National Organisation (UMNO). He was elected to the Supreme Council of UMNO in 2009.

Education and early career
Ahmad Shabery was born in Kijal, Kemaman, Terengganu, on 10 December 1958, and received his early education at the Sekolah Sungai Lembing and Sekolah Datuk Abdul Razak in Seremban.

In 1983, he pursued a course in economics at the Universiti Malaya. During this period, he was also elected as the president of the university's Muslim Students Association. In 1986, he obtained his bachelor's degree from the University of Leeds and in 1989 he obtained a postgraduate diploma in International Relations from the Uppsala University in Sweden. That same year, he was appointed the Secretary of the Malaysian Social Science Association (PSSM).

In 1990, he became a lecturer in the University Malaya's Faculty of Economics and Administration. He has also served as a Research Fellow at the Institute of Southeast Asian Studies in Singapore.

Political career
Ahmad Shabery left UMNO in 1989 to join other members rebelling against the then-Prime Minister Mahathir Mohamad in the newly formed breakaway Parti Melayu Semangat 46 (S46), until its dissolution in 1996 where he rejoined UMNO again.

In 2004, he was elected as the Member of Parliament for Kemaman, defeating incumbent Abd Rahman Yusof of the People's Justice Party (PKR) by 15,882 votes. In 2008, he retained the seat after beating PKR's Fariz Musa by 12,682 votes, and won again in 2013, defeating Kamaruddin Chik (PKR) by 12,306 votes. But in the 2018 general election, he lost the parliamentary seat.

After the 2008 general election, which saw the incumbent Information Minister Zainuddin Maidin lose his parliamentary seat, the then-Prime Minister Abdullah Ahmad Badawi appointed Ahmad as Zainuddin's replacement.

On 15 July 2008, Ahmad Shabery Cheek participated in a historic debate on the national fuel price with the opposition leader Anwar Ibrahim, which was televised live.

In April 2009, the new Prime Minister Najib Razak appointed him as the Minister for Youth and Sports. After the 13th General Election, he was appointed as Minister of Communication and Multimedia.

In 2015, he was appointed as the Minister of Agriculture and Agro-based Industry in a cabinet reshuffle. When he and BN lost in the 2018 general election, he was replaced by Salahuddin Ayub from the Pakatan Harapan (PH) new government.

Election results

Honours
  :
  Companion of the Order of the Crown of Terengganu (SMT) (2005)
  Knight Commander of the Order of the Crown of Terengganu (DPMT) – Dato' (2007)
  :
  Grand Knight of the Order of Sultan Ahmad Shah of Pahang (SSAP) – Dato' Sri (2010)

See also
 Kemaman (federal constituency)

References 

 
 

1958 births
Living people
People from Terengganu
Malaysian people of Malay descent
Malaysian Muslims
United Malays National Organisation politicians
Parti Melayu Semangat 46 politicians
Members of the Dewan Rakyat
Government ministers of Malaysia
Alumni of the University of Leeds
University of Malaya alumni
Academic staff of the University of Malaya
21st-century Malaysian politicians
Agriculture ministers of Malaysia
Knights Commander of the Order of the Crown of Terengganu